|}

This is a list of electoral district results of the 1989 Western Australian election.

Results by electoral district

Albany

Applecross

Armadale

Ashburton

Avon

Balcatta

Belmont

Bunbury

Cockburn

Collie

Cottesloe

Darling Range

Dianella

Eyre

Floreat

Fremantle

Geraldton

Glendalough

Greenough

Helena

Jandakot

Kalgoorlie

Kenwick

Kimberley

Kingsley

Mandurah

Marangaroo

Marmion

Maylands

Melville

Merredin

Mitchell

Moore

Morley

Murray

Nedlands

Nollamara

Northern Rivers

Peel

Perth

Pilbara

Riverton

Rockingham

Roe

Roleystone

Scarborough

South Perth

Stirling

Swan Hills

Thornlie

Vasse

Victoria Park

Wagin

Wanneroo

Warren 

 In the redistribution, Warren became a notional Liberal seat.

Wellington

Whitford

See also 

 Results of the Western Australian state election, 1989 (Legislative Council)
 1989 Western Australian state election
 Candidates of the Western Australian state election, 1989
 Members of the Western Australian Legislative Assembly, 1989–1993

References 

Results of Western Australian elections
1989 elections in Australia